In commutative algebra the Hilbert–Samuel function, named after David Hilbert and Pierre Samuel, of a nonzero finitely generated module  over a commutative Noetherian local ring  and a primary ideal  of  is the map  such that, for all ,

It is related to the Hilbert function of the associated graded module  by the identity

 

Examples

For the ring of formal power series in two variables  taken as a module over itself and the ideal  generated by the monomials x2 and y3 we have

Degree bounds 
Unlike the Hilbert function, the Hilbert–Samuel function is not additive on an exact sequence. However, it is still reasonably close to being additive, as a consequence of the Artin–Rees lemma. We denote by  the Hilbert-Samuel polynomial; i.e., it coincides with the Hilbert–Samuel function for large integers.
 

which gives us:
.
The third term on the right can be estimated by Artin-Rees. Indeed, by the lemma, for large n and some k,

Thus,
.
This gives the desired degree bound.

Multiplicity 

If  is a local ring of Krull dimension , with -primary ideal , its Hilbert polynomial has leading term of the form  for some integer . This integer  is called the multiplicity of the ideal .

The multiplicity of a point  of a scheme  is defined to be the multiplicity of the corresponding local ring .

See also 
j-multiplicity

References

Commutative algebra
Algebraic geometry